Carl Gustaf Sixtensson Lewenhaupt (20 August 1879 – 7 August 1962) was a Swedish Count, officer, courtier, horse rider and modern pentathlete who competed in the 1912 Summer Olympics.

In the equestrian jumping event he finished ninth individually (tied with his brother Charles Lewenhaupt) and won the gold medal with the Swedish team. He placed seventeenth in the modern pentathlon competition.

See also
 Dual sport and multi-sport Olympians

References

External links
 

1879 births
1962 deaths
Swedish male equestrians
Swedish male modern pentathletes
Equestrians at the 1912 Summer Olympics
Modern pentathletes at the 1912 Summer Olympics
Olympic modern pentathletes of Sweden
Olympic equestrians of Sweden
Olympic gold medalists for Sweden
Swedish show jumping riders
Olympic medalists in equestrian
Sportspeople from Örebro
Swedish Army officers
Medalists at the 1912 Summer Olympics